Pabellón Polideportivo Municipal Fernando Argüelles is an arena in Antequera, Spain. It is primarily used for team handball and is the home arena of BM Antequera. The arena holds 2,575 people.

References 

Handball venues in Spain
Indoor arenas in Spain
Sports venues completed in 1980
Sports venues in Andalusia
Buildings and structures in Antequera
Sport in Antequera